WQBC was an AM broadcasting station licensed on 1420 kHz at Vicksburg, Mississippi. It was licensed on October 24, 1927, and made the claim of being the oldest operating radio station in Mississippi and one of the few remaining stations that still had their original call signs. Its license was surrendered September 28, 2020, after having been off the air since January 12, 2019.

Well-known alumni of WQBC included Blues extraordinaire Willie Dixon, and his Jubilee Singers, Adrian Cronauer, the inspiration for Good Morning, Vietnam; and Woodie Assaf, longest-serving weatherman in the United States, who began his broadcasting career at WQBC in the 1940s, before moving to 620 WJDX (AM) in Jackson, Mississippi and serving at its sister station WLBT TV 3 from sign-on in December 1953.

History
WQBC was first licensed on October 24, 1927 in Utica, Mississippi to I. R. Jones, who built and first operated the station. The call letters were randomly assigned from a sequential roster of available call signs. In 1931, it was bought by the Cashman family, owners of the Vicksburg Evening Post, and moved to Vicksburg. When Federal Communications Commission (FCC) rules banned cross ownership of newspapers and broadcast stations in the same area, WQBC was sold to Frank Hollifield, then to Elizabeth Owens. Bill Stanford bought the station in 1987. The station was later owned by Michael Corley.

WQBC was last owned by Costar Broadcast Group a Chicago, Illinois based multi-media communications firm. The company's President was Michael M. Davis a native son of Lorman, Mississippi - the site of Alcorn State University, the first African-American land grant institution in the United States.

WQBC lost the lease on its tower site and went silent on March 12, 2010 while the sale to Michael M. Davis was pending. It received an extension to remain silent on November 18, 2010, pending studies for a new construction permit.

On January 12, 2019, WQBC went silent. Its license was surrendered September 28, 2020 and cancelled by the FCC on September 29, 2020.

References

External links
FCC Station Search Details: DWQBC (Facility ID: 60000)
FCC History Cards for WQBC (covering 1927-1979)

Radio stations established in 1927
1927 establishments in Mississippi
QBC
Hinds County, Mississippi
Vicksburg, Mississippi
Radio stations disestablished in 2020
2020 disestablishments in Mississippi
Defunct radio stations in the United States
QBC